Cashmere is a suburb which rises above the southern end of the city of Christchurch in New Zealand's South Island.

Geography
Cashmere is situated on the north side of the Port Hills, immediately above the southern terminus of Colombo Street and approximately five kilometres south of the city centre. The suburb's location on the Port Hills offers it a commanding view over the rest of the mostly flat city. Cashmere's proximity to the rest of the Port Hills has also made it a favourite for recreation, with the upper reaches of the suburb dominated by Victoria Park with its multiple bike and walking tracks and connections to further tracks running the length of the Port Hills. Above Victoria Park is Sugarloaf, a  peak which is the location of a  transmission tower used for local radio and TV stations. The Ōpāwaho / Heathcote River marks the northern extent of the suburb, flowing roughly along the base of the Port Hills.

History
Cashmere takes its name from Sir John Cracroft Wilson's farm in the area, which in turn was named after his birthplace of Kashmir (with Cashmere being the British spelling of that region at the time). Wilson briefly moved to Christchurch in 1854 from India by way of Australia, where he purchased 108 hectares of land to develop into Cashmere farm. Wilson built multiple farm buildings on the property, some of which persist to this day. In 1979, the house Wilson built for his Indian workers became a function centre known as "The Old Stone House". The building has been significantly damaged and restored twice, following a fire in 1971 and earthquakes in 2010 and 2011.

In the late 19th century, the area around Cashmere began to be settled by Europeans. Homes began to be built in Cashmere in the 1890s, although informal church services were being held as early as the 1880s. In response to the growth of this congregation, land from John Cracroft Wilson donated land for a church, which was completed in 1908 and marked the parish's formal split from neighbouring Sydenham. At roughly the same time, the Christchurch tramway system was extended to include the area, with the previous Cashmere line being extended from the southern end of Colombo street to the future site of the Sign of the Takahe. The tram line continued operation until 1954, with Cashmere gaining a reputation as one of the country's more well-to-do and refined suburbs in the process. This reputation continues to the present day, with the 2018 census showing that Cashmere has a significantly higher percentage of incomes over NZ$70,000 than the rest of Christchurch city.

Demographics

Cashmere, comprising the statistical areas of Cashmere West and Cashmere East, had a population of 6,453 at the 2018 New Zealand census, an increase of 318 people (5.2%) since the 2013 census, and an increase of 120 people (1.9%) since the 2006 census. There were 2,394 households. There were 3,198 males and 3,255 females, giving a sex ratio of 0.98 males per female, with 1,206 people (18.7%) aged under 15 years, 1,017 (15.8%) aged 15 to 29, 3,084 (47.8%) aged 30 to 64, and 1,149 (17.8%) aged 65 or older.

Ethnicities were 92.4% European/Pākehā, 4.4% Māori, 0.8% Pacific peoples, 5.3% Asian, and 2.4% other ethnicities (totals add to more than 100% since people could identify with multiple ethnicities).

The proportion of people born overseas was 24.9%, compared with 27.1% nationally.

Although some people objected to giving their religion, 55.9% had no religion, 34.6% were Christian, 0.3% were Hindu, 0.5% were Muslim, 1.0% were Buddhist and 2.2% had other religions.

Of those at least 15 years old, 2,274 (43.3%) people had a bachelor or higher degree, and 411 (7.8%) people had no formal qualifications. The employment status of those at least 15 was that 2,658 (50.7%) people were employed full-time, 990 (18.9%) were part-time, and 120 (2.3%) were unemployed.

Buildings and infrastructure

Two of Harry Ell's rest houses, the Sign of the Takahe and the Sign of the Kiwi, are located in Cashmere. Both are Category I heritage buildings. Dame Ngaio Marsh's former house in Valley Road is a museum run in her memory. It is registered by Heritage New Zealand as a Category I heritage item.

Princess Margaret Hospital, built in 1959, was once thought to become the main hospital of Christchurch, but it was too far from the central city.

The Cashmere Club is home to many local sports groups including rugby, soccer, bowls, badminton, darts, squash and small bore rifle shooting. The Canterbury Ring Laser facility is located in the Cracroft Caverns, an underground bunker complex built during World War II. Christchurch Adventure Park is a mountain bike park that opened in December 2016.

Education
Cashmere Primary Te Pae Kererū is a full primary school for years 1 to 8 with a roll of  students. It opened in 1900 as Port Hills Aided School and moved to the current site in 1905. The name changed to Cashmere School in 1907.

Te Kura o Huriawa Thorrington is a contributing primary school for years 1 to 6 with a roll of  students. It opened in 1958.

Both schools are coeducational. Rolls are as of

Notable residents

Ursula Bethell (1874–1945), poet
Fanny B. Cole (1860-1913), national president of Women's Christian Temperance Union New Zealand
Ruth Dyson (born 1957), politician
Norman Hardie (born 1924), mountaineer
Ngaio Marsh (1895–1982), world-renowned crime writer who lived in 37 Valley Road from 1907 until her death
T.E. "Tommy" Taylor (1862-1911)], politician
John Cracroft Wilson (1808–1881), Member of Parliament

References

External links
Cashmere Primary School
Cashmere squash club
Thorrington Primary School

Suburbs of Christchurch